Swedish youth football champions is a collection of several different titles in Swedish football that have been awarded to the winners of youth tournaments. For club teams, Swedish junior championships have been organised for boys since 1982 and for girls since 2018. Swedish boys championships have been organised since 1988, while Swedish girls championships have been organised between 1994 and 1997, and since 2009. A Swedish under-16 championship for boys has been organised since 2019. For teams of the district football associations of the Swedish Football Association, a district junior championship for boys was played between 1962 and 1994. District boys championships have been organised since 1975, while district girls championships have been organised since 1982.

Junior champions for club teams

Boys
The junior championships for club teams (also  or ) for boys have been played since 1982, but the competition had several unofficial precursors. A cup tournament, was played from 1945 to 1976, and was open to member clubs of the Swedish Professional Football Leagues. The title unofficial junior champions was awarded to the winners of the tournament, which was discontinued when the newspaper Expressen withdrew their sponsorship. For the years between 1949 and 1958, the winner of this cup also played a national final against the winners of the Norrland junior championships.

The Swedish Professional Football Leagues also arranged a league starting in 1971, only open to youth teams of Allsvenskan clubs. A champion was decided through a final match between group winners, and was open to all Swedish Professional Football Leagues members from 1977. This league was sometimes also called , and saw continued play in parallel to the in 1982 introduced official junior championships, initially played in a strict cup format.

, the championship is played in league format, currently named , consisting of two regional groups of 15 teams, followed by a final between the two winning teams to determine the junior champions. From 2022, the league format will be changed to consist of a single group of 14 teams.

From 1982 until 2008, the championships were played with an age limit of 18, but from 2009 on the age limit has been 19.

Champions

Performances

Girls
The junior championships for club teams (also  or ) for girls have been played since 2018 and have always been played with an age limit of 19.

Champions

Performances

Boys and girls champions for club teams

Boys
The boys championships for club teams (also  or ) have been played since 1988. The championships were played with an age limit of 16 until 2009, but from 2010 on the age limit has been 17.

Champions

Performances

Girls
The girls championships for club teams (also  or ) have been played between 1994 and 1997, and since 2009. The championships were played with an age limit of 16 from 2009 until 2018, but between 1994 and 1997 and from 2019 on the age limit has been 17.

Champions

Performances

Under-16 champions for club teams

Boys
A new national competition with an age limit of 16 was reintroduced for boys in 2016, and gained official Swedish championship status in 2019.

Champions

Performances

District junior champions

Boys

Champions

Performances

District boys and girls champions

Boys

Champions

Performances

Girls

Champions

Performances

See also
List of Swedish football champions
P19 Allsvenskan

Footnotes

Citations

References

Youth champions
Sweden Y
youth champions
Youth football in Sweden